Winner in You is the eighth studio album by American R&B singer-songwriter Patti LaBelle. It was released by MCA Records on April 28, 1986, in the United States. Recording sessions took place during 1985–1986. Production was handled by several record producers, including Burt Bacharach, Carole Bayer Sager, and Nickolas Ashford, among others.

The album peaked at number one on the US Billboard 200 chart, as well as producing the US number-one hit single "On My Own". It was LaBelle's only album to chart outside of the United States, charting in the Netherlands, New Zealand, Sweden, and the United Kingdom. To date, the album is estimated to have sold over eight million copies worldwide, becoming her best-selling album ever. Upon its release, Winner in You received moderate reviews from music critics. The album has been certified platinum by the Recording Industry Association of America (RIAA). LaBelle embarked on the Winner in You Tour from 1986 to 1987, touring Europe to promote her album.

Release and promotion

Singles 
The first single to be released off of Winner in You was "On My Own", featuring Michael McDonald. It peaked at number one on the Billboard Hot 100, as well as the top spot of the Billboard Hot R&B Songs, and almost topped the Billboard Adult Contemporary Songs (instead reaching No. 2 on the latter chart). It also charted internationally, peaking at number two in the UK Singles Chart, number one on the Canadian Singles Chart, number one in the Dutch Singles Chart, number four in the New Zealand Singles Chart, number fifteen in the Swedish Singles Chart, and number twenty on the Austrian Singles Chart.

The second single to be released was "Oh, People". It peaked at number twenty-nine on the Billboard Hot 100 and number seven on the Billboard Hot R&B/Hip-Hop Songs. It was the second single to chart internationally, peaking at thirty-one on the Dutch Singles Chart, and number thirty-six on the New Zealand Singles Chart. The third single to be released was "Kiss Away the Pain". It was not as successful as the two prior singles, only reaching number thirteen on the Billboard Hot R&B/Hip-Hop Songs. The final single to be released was "Something Special (Is Gonna Happen Tonight)," reaching number fifty on the Billboard Hot R&B/Hip-Hop Singles. It is played twice in Sweet Liberty and over the opening credits of Outrageous Fortune.

Critical response 

Winner in You received average reviews from critics. Ron Wynn on Allmusic gave the album three out of five stars. Wynn claims this is the album that made LaBelle's solo career. He enjoys the songs "Oh, People" and "Kiss Away the Pain", which he believed needed to chart higher on the Billboard Top 40. Robert Christgau gave the album a B, praising the duet with Michael McDonald as well as LaBelle's singing abilities. Christgau also compliments her and her family's songwriting abilities. He believes this is how LaBelle became a multi-platinum solo artist.  Christgau did not like the earlier part of the album, claiming she "doesn't start out with such surefire goods". Overall, he says the "beats and tunes kick in till you could care less [sic] what organ she's singing through." Kim Farber of Billboard gave the album a mixed review, claiming it to be inconsistent. He believes album was not a "hands-down winner so many anticipated," saying how none of the fast tracks have a "jump." Ferber, although, praises her singing ability and says that is the only thing that saved the album. He said the ballads were well written, and enjoyed "On My Own", saying the song is "something real" and likes the song "Oh, People" even more.

Commercial performance 
The album peaked at number one on the US Billboard 200 and on Billboard R&B/Hip-Hop Albums. It spent 29 weeks on the Billboard 200 and spent 33 weeks on the R&B/Hip-Hop Albums. On June 27, 1986, Winner in You was certified Platinum by the Recording Industry Association of America (RIAA), for shipments of one million copies in the US. Winner in You attained respectable international charting. In the Netherlands, it entered at number twenty-eight on the Mega Album Top 100. In New Zealand, it entered at number ten on the Top 40 Albums. In Sweden, it entered at number seventeen on the Albums Top 60. In the United Kingdom, it entered at number thirty-four and peaked at number 30 on the UK Albums Chart.

Track listing

Personnel and production 
 Executive producer – Patti LaBelle
 Tracks 1, 5 & 8 produced by Richard Perry; Co-production on track 1 by Andy Goldmark and Bruce Roberts; Associate producer on track 5: Bill LaBounty; Co-production on track 8 by Richard Page and Steve George.  Recorded by Michael Brooks, with assistance by Glen Holgiun, Julie Last, John Boghosian, Thom Panunzio and Kraig Miller. Tracks 1 and 5 mixed by Bill Schnee; Track 8 mixed by Don Smith. 
 Paul Fox, Robbie Buchanan, Bill LaBounty – synthesizers and drum programming; Howie Rice – synthesizers, drum fills; Steve George – synthesizers; Steve Mitchell – synthesizers; Andy Goldmark – acoustic piano; Paul Jackson, Jr., Charles Fearing, Michael Landau – guitars; Nathan East – bass; Terral Santiel – percussion; The Sweeties, Patti LaBelle – backing vocals.
 Tracks 2 & 9 produced by Burt Bacharach and Carole Bayer-Sager.  Recorded and mixed by Joel Moss and Mick Guzauski. 
 David Foster, Peter Wolf, Greg Phillinganes, Randy Kerber – synthesizers; Burt Bacharach – acoustic piano; Dann Huff – guitars; Neil Stubenhaus, Freddie Washington – bass; Carlos Vega, John Robinson – drums, percussion.
 Track 6 produced by Richard Perry and Howie Rice. Recorded by John Arrias; Assisted by John Boghosian, Norman Whitfield Jr., Glen Holgiun and Kraig Miller. Mixed by Norman Whitfield Jr.
 Howie Rice – keyboards, synthesizers, guitars, drum programming; Paulinho da Costa – percussion
 Track 3 produced by Howie Rice and Budd Ellison. Recorded by Brin Swimmer; Assisted by Glen Kurtz.  Mixed by Louil Silas, Jr.
 Howie Rice – keyboards, guitars; Le Quient Jobe – bass; Teral Santiel, James Gadson – percussion.
 Track 4 produced by Budd Ellison and Ron Kersey. Recorded by Brin Swimmer; Assisted by Dennis Stefani and Glen Kurtz. Mixed by Taavi Mote.
 Ron Kersey – synthesizers, grand piano; Will Bryant – synthesizers; David T. Walker, Leo Nocentelli – guitars; Freddie Washington – bass; James Gadson – drums; George Howard – saxophone.
 Track 7 produced by Nick Johnson and Budd Ellison. Recorded by Brin Swimmer and Robert Biles. Mixed by Robert Biles.
 Nick Johnson – synthesizers, acoustic piano; William Bryant – synthesizers; Leo Nocentelli, David T. Walker – guitars; Freddie Washington – bass; James Gadson – drums; Nate Neblett – Simmons drums; David I. – saxophone
 Track 10 produced by Nickolas Ashford and Valerie Simpson for Hopsack & Silk Productions, Inc.  Recorded by Tim Cox; Mixed by Michael Hutchinson.
 Joseph Joubert – keyboards; Chris Parker – drums, percussion.

Recording studios 
 Tracks 1, 5, 6 & 8 recorded and mixed at Studio 55 (Los Angeles, CA).
 Track 2 recorded at Conway Studios (Hollywood, CA), Lion Share Recording (Los Angeles, CA) and Bill Schnee Studios (Hollywood, CA).
 Track 3 recorded at Baby O' Recorders (Hollywood, CA). Remixed at Larrabee Sound Studios (Hollywood, CA).
 Track 4 recorded at Baby O' Recorders and Westlake Audio (Los Angeles, CA). Mixed at Larrabee Sound Studios.
 Track 7 recorded at Baby O' Recorders and Soundcastle Studios (Hollywood, CA). Mixed at Soundcastle Studios.
 Track 9 recorded at One on One Studios, Lion Share Recording and Conway Studios.
 Track 10 recorded at 39th Street Studios (New York, NY). Mixed at The Hit Factory (New York, NY).

Additional credits 
 James Budd Ellison – production supervisor 
 Cheryl Dickerson – A&R manager 
 Jeff Adamoff – design 
 September – art direction, design 
 Ann Field – illustration 
 Marc Raboy – photography 
 Gallin Morey Associates – management

Charts

Weekly charts

Year-end charts

Certifications

References

Patti LaBelle albums
1986 albums
Albums produced by Ashford & Simpson
Albums produced by Burt Bacharach
Albums produced by Richard Perry
MCA Records albums